The 1991 Jordanian  League (known as The Jordanian  League,   was the 41st season of Jordan  League since its inception in 1944. Al-Wehdat  won its (3rd title).
The Jordan League 1991 season was contested by 10 teams.

Teams

Map

League standings

References
Jordan - List of final tables (RSSSF)

Jordanian Pro League seasons
Jordan
football
football